Athens is a village in Claiborne Parish, Louisiana, United States. The population was 249 at the 2010 census.

History
The village was named after the ancient city of Athens, capital of Greece.  Athens became the parish seat of Claiborne Parish in 1846, but in 1848, fire destroyed the courthouse and all the records in it.  Soon thereafter, the Claiborne Parish Police Jury decided to move the parish seat to its present location in Homer.

Geography
Athens is located at  (32.650219, -93.024492).

Demographics

As of the census of 2000, there were 262 people, 112 households, and 73 families residing in the village. The racial makeup of the village was 72.52% White, 24.05% African American, 2.29% Native American, 0.38% Pacific Islander, and 0.76% from two or more races.

There were 112 households, out of which 34.8% had children under the age of 18 living with them, 42.9% were married couples living together, 16.1% had a female householder with no husband present, and 34.8% were non-families. 30.4% of all households were made up of individuals, and 21.4% had someone living alone who was 65 years of age or older. The average household size was 2.34 and the average family size was 2.93.

In the village, the population was spread out, with 28.6% under the age of 18, 5.7% from 18 to 24, 27.1% from 25 to 44, 19.8% from 45 to 64, and 18.7% who were 65 years of age or older. The median age was 37 years. For every 100 females, there were 83.2 males. For every 100 females age 18 and over, there were 78.1 males.

The median income for a household in the village was $18,750, and the median income for a family was $26,750. Males had a median income of $23,393 versus $22,250 for females. The per capita income for the village was $13,033. About 7.0% of families and 14.2% of the population were below the poverty line, including 13.6% of those under the age of eighteen and 20.0% of those 65 or over.

Government and infrastructure
The United States Postal Service operates the Athens Post Office.

Education
The Mt. Olive Christian School, pre-kindergarten through twelfth grade, operates in the former Athens High School building, constructed in 1930, with the last graduating class there in 1969.

Notable people
Jessie Johnson Couch, wife of utilities, railroad, and radio magnate Harvey Couch, was an Athens native.
Kenneth L. Volentine, former member of the Louisiana House of Representatives, with service from 1988 to 1992, and sheriff of Claiborne Parish from 1996 to 2004.

References

External links

Village of Athens Official Website

Villages in Claiborne Parish, Louisiana
Villages in Louisiana